Microbacterium yannicii is a Gram-positive, rod-shaped, microaerophilic and non-motile bacterium from the genus Microbacterium which has been isolated from roots of the plant Arabidopsis thaliana in Golm, Germany.

References 

Bacteria described in 2012
yannicii